Windscoop Nunataks is a cluster of four gable-shaped nunataks rising to about 400 m between Porphyry Bluff and Tower Peak on Nordenskjold Coast, Graham Land, Antarctica. So named by United Kingdom Antarctic Place-Names Committee (UK-APC) following British Antarctic Survey (BAS) geological work, 1978–79, from the windscoops associated with each nunatak.

Nunataks of Graham Land
Nordenskjöld Coast